Bhavaniyambalpuram is a village in the Papanasam taluk of Thanjavur district, Tamil Nadu, India.

Demographics 

As per the 2001 census, Bhavaniyambalpuram had a total population of 811 with 393 males and 418 females. The sex ratio was 1064. The literacy rate was 82.26.

References 

 

Villages in Thanjavur district